Treat Conrad Huey and Dominic Inglot were the defending champions, but Inglot decided not to participate. Huey partnered up with Frederik Nielsen.

Juan Sebastián Cabal and Robert Farah won this tournament. They defeated Treat Conrad Huey and Frederik Nielsen 6–4, 6–3 in the final.

Seeds

Draw

Draw

References
 Main draw

Doubles